Gabriel Oliveira Santos Campos (born 11 August 1999), known as Gabriel Santos, is a Brazilian footballer who plays as a forward for Sport.

Career statistics

Honours
São Bernardo
Campeonato Paulista Série A2: 2021

References

External links

1999 births
Living people
Footballers from Rio de Janeiro (city)
Association football forwards
Campeonato Brasileiro Série A players
Campeonato Brasileiro Série B players
Campeonato Brasileiro Série D players
Ukrainian First League players
Ukrainian Second League players
Sampaio Corrêa Futebol e Esporte players
FC Rukh Lviv players
FC Kalush players
São Bernardo Futebol Clube players
Associação Atlética Caldense players
Ceará Sporting Club players
Londrina Esporte Clube players
Sport Club do Recife players
Brazilian expatriate footballers
Brazilian expatriate sportspeople in Ukraine
Expatriate footballers in Ukraine
Brazilian footballers